John Willis Ellis (November 23, 1820 – July 7, 1861) was the 35th Governor of the U.S. state of North Carolina from 1859 to 1861. He was born in Rowan County, North Carolina.

Ellis attended the University of North Carolina, studied law under Richmond Mumford Pearson, practiced law, and was elected to the North Carolina General Assembly from Rowan County.  He served as a state superior court judge from 1848 to 1858.  He was elected Governor in 1858 by a large majority over Duncan K. McRae, a Democrat supported by remnants of the Whig Party.  Ellis was easily re-elected in 1860 over John Pool.

As the American Civil War was beginning, President Abraham Lincoln requested troops from North Carolina to quell the rebellion.  Ellis replied, "I can be no party to this wicked violation of the laws of the country and to this war upon the liberties of a free people.  You can get no troops from North Carolina." During the start of the U.S. Civil War Governor John Willis Ellis ordered cadets from the North Carolina Military Academy to Raleigh, North Carolina to serve as drill masters.

Shortly after North Carolina seceded from the Union, Ellis died in office.  The Speaker of the North Carolina Senate, Henry T. Clark, completed his term. He is buried at the Old English Cemetery in Salisbury, North Carolina.

External links
North Carolina History Project
Speech Accepting Democratic Nomination for Governor: March 9, 1860

1820 births
1861 deaths
Democratic Party governors of North Carolina
North Carolina state court judges
People of North Carolina in the American Civil War
Confederate States of America state governors
19th-century American politicians
19th-century American judges